Reuben Richard Figuhr was the 15th president of the Seventh-day Adventist Church General Conference. He was born in Superior, Wisconsin, United States October 20, 1896. He served as Adventist president between 1954 and 1966. He married May Belle Holt. Figuhr died in Napa, California on October 28, 1983.

Biography 
Reuben Richard Figuhr was born of Prussian descent on October 20, 1896, in Wisconsin. He served in the Philippines and then as the president of the South American Division, and then at the age of 58, just a year before the evangelical conferences, Figuhr became president of the General Conference (1954–1966). He became embroiled in a controversy over the publishing of Questions on Doctrine which became the centerpiece event of his administration. At times he was frustrated by how far Le Roy Edwin Froom and M. L. Andreasen were going into the debate over the book. But he stood behind it.

He married May Belle Holt. Figuhr died in Napa, California, on October 28, 1983.

See also 

 History of the Seventh-day Adventist Church
 General Conference of Seventh-day Adventists
 Seventh-day Adventist Church

References

1896 births
1983 deaths
People from Superior, Wisconsin
American Seventh-day Adventists
Seventh-day Adventist administrators
Seventh-day Adventist religious workers
American Seventh-day Adventist ministers
History of the Seventh-day Adventist Church